Three is the 2009 comeback album and final release from Ph.D.  It was their first album since 1983's Is It Safe?.

Track listing
All songs written by Jim Diamond and Tony Hymas, except where noted.

A Land of Your Own 5.05
With You I Feel Like+ 5.32
Drive Time+ 5.52
Precious Cargo 6.40
Got to Believe 5.37
We All Fall Down 4.33
Said and Done 5.31
Fifth of May++  6.34
What Becomes of the Brokenhearted?+++ (James Dean, Paul Riser, William Weatherspoon) 4.25

+ Originally recorded for Jim Diamond (1988).
++ Originally recorded for Is It Safe?.
+++ Originally recorded by Jimmy Ruffin.

Personnel
Jim Diamond - vocals
Tony Hymas - keyboards, production, programming, mixing, engineering

Additional personnel
Simon Phillips - drums on 1, 3, and 4
Jeff Lee Johnson - guitar on 3 and 9
Tom Hymas - production assistance
Mark Wilkinson - artwork

External links
Ph.D. Discography

2009 albums
Ph.D. (band) albums
Voiceprint Records albums